Messestadt Ost is a Munich U-Bahn station on line  U2.

Overview 
The station was opened on 29 May 1999 and is located in the below the Willy-Brandt-Allee in the Messestadt Riem neighbourhood, the eastern part of which it serves. The walls are concrete covered by wavy aluminium, intended to evoke the airplanes that used to land at the Munich-Riem Airport which the neighbourhood has replaced. The station is illuminated by two rows of neon tubes with a curved reflector, and the floor is covered by granite slabs with red lines perpendicular to the tracks. Escalators and stairs lead to a mezzanine at the eastern end where there are pictures exhibited from the construction period. At the exit there is a sundial where the time can be read on the wall. The codenames of the station were Riem Ost and Neu-Riem Ost.

Stations

References

External links 
 More information

Munich U-Bahn stations
Railway stations in Germany opened in 1999